Pedraforca is a mountain in the Pre-Pyrenees, located in the comarca of Berguedà. The mountain's rare form, along with the fact that it is not visibly connected to any other adjacent mountains or ridges, has made it one of the most famous and emblematic mountains in  Catalonia, the northeasternmost region of Spain.

Description
The mountain has a peculiar, forked shape composed of two parallel peaks (the pollegons) joined by a neck (the enforcadura). The loftier peak, called Pollegó superior, has an elevation of 2,506.4 m,  with a secondary peak, el Calderer, at 2,496.4 m in height. The lower peak, the Pollegó inferior is 2,444.8 m tall, while the Enforcadura'''s highest point lies at 2,356.2 m, with a scree field (tartera'' in Catalan) on both faces of the mountain.

Location

Located within the Cadí-Moixeró Natural Park, Pedraforca has been declared a Natural Site of National Interest by the Generalitat de Catalunya. 
 
The closest villages to Pedraforca are Gósol to the west and Saldes to the east. Pedraforca marks the boundary between the two municipalities, as well as between the provinces of Barcelona and Lleida.

Significance
Pedraforca is, along with the mountains of Montserrat and Canigó, one of the emblematic mountains of Catalonia. This fame has made Pedraforca a popular destination for hikers and rock climbers, as well as being used by the comarca of Berguedà in its coat of arms.

References

External links

 Pedraforca
 Refugi Lluís Estasen

Mountains of Catalonia
Pre-Pyrenees
Emblematic summits of Catalonia